Piedras Negras Municipality is one of the 38 municipalities of Coahuila, in north-eastern Mexico. The municipal seat lies at Piedras Negras. The municipality covers an area of 914.2 km² and is located on the international border between Mexico and the USA, here formed by the Río Bravo del Norte (Rio Grande), adjacent to the U.S. state of Texas.

As of 2010, the municipality had a total population of 152,806.

Towns and villages

The largest localities (cities, towns, and villages) are:

Adjacent municipalities and counties

 Nava Municipality - south
 Zaragoza Municipality - west
 Jiménez Municipality - north
 Maverick County, Texas - northeast

References

Municipalities of Coahuila
Coahuila populated places on the Rio Grande